Daniel Edward Flynn (14 June 1880 – 11 June 1965) was an Australian rules footballer.

In a very brief career with the Essendon Football Club, Flynn managed just one game during the 1903 season in the Victorian Football League, a draw against St Kilda. He was recruited from Preston in the VJFA.

References

External links

Essendon Football Club profile

Essendon Football Club players
Preston Football Club (VFA) players
Australian rules footballers from Victoria (Australia)
1880 births
1965 deaths